The Flower of No Man's Land is a lost 1916 silent film drama directed by John H. Collins and starring Viola Dana. It was distributed by Metro Pictures.

Cast
Viola Dana - Echo
Duncan McRae - Roy Talbot
Harry C. Browne - Big Bill
Mitchell Lewis - Kahoma
Fred Jones - Pedro
Nellie G. Mitchell - Mrs. Talbot
Eldine Steuart - Talbot child
Marcus Moriarity - Potter the butler

References

External links

1916 films
Lost American films
American silent feature films
American black-and-white films
Silent American drama films
1916 drama films
Metro Pictures films
Films directed by John H. Collins
1916 lost films
Lost drama films
1910s American films